McIlroy is an Scottish/Irish surname, and may refer to:

People with the surname 
Brien McIlroy (1939–1995), Scottish footballer
David McIlroy (born 1968), British diplomat
Douglas McIlroy (born 1932), mathematician, engineer, and programmer
James McIlroy (disambiguation), various people
Jimmy McIlroy (1931–2018), Northern Ireland international footballer
Joel McIlroy (born 1973), Australian actor
Louise McIlroy (1874–1968), Irish-born British physician
Rory McIlroy (born 1989), professional golfer from Northern Ireland
Sammy McIlroy (born 1954), former Northern Ireland international footballer
William McIlroy (disambiguation), various people

Fictional characters 
Milton McIlroy, character from GTA V
Payne McIlroy, character from American sitcom Designing Women

See also
McElroy

References

Scottish surnames
Surnames of Ulster-Scottish origin
Scottish Gaelic-language surnames

Surnames of British Isles origin